Thespesia cubensis is a species of flowering plant in the family Malvaceae. It is found only in Cuba. It is threatened by habitat loss.

References

cubensis
Flora of Cuba
Endangered plants
Taxonomy articles created by Polbot
Taxobox binomials not recognized by IUCN